Chungbuk National University (CBNU) is one of ten Flagship Korean National Universities. It takes its name, Chungbuk, from the common abbreviated form of the province's Korean name Chungcheongbuk-do.

Overview 

Chungbuk National University is located in the central-west part of Cheongju city, which is the provincial capital of North Chungcheong Province.

By 2014, The university is made up of 15 colleges, 83 departments, and 9 graduate schools. There are 36 research institutes that serve as adjunct centers for the faculty research activities. Other supporting organizations include the University Libraries, the University Museum, the Center for Research Instruments and Experimental Facilities, and the University Computer Center. There are over 18,000 students enrolled in undergraduate and graduate programs at Chungbuk National University, with 755 faculty members. CBNU welcomes students from all over the world to join in its academic experience.

Dongah-Ilbo newspaper ranked CBNU 2nd in the Korean Internet sector (1997). CBNU won an "Excellent University" award from the Korean Ministry of Education (1997) in fields such as "educational reform in the information sector", "reform of school affairs", and "educational reform for extending student＇s freedom to choose his or her major field". CBNU is the only university that has been awarded the specialized program grant in the semiconductor and information technology area by the government of Korea. As an outcome, the College of Engineering won approximately US$25,000,000 from the government for the training of quality manpower, as required in industry, by providing experience-based programs (1994–1999). The School of Electrical Engineering and Computer Science has been awarded the Brain Korea 21 program with an annual multimillion-dollar grant, while the Physics and Pharmacy research teams have won research grants.

The Health, Medicine, and Life Science Program at Osong, near Cheongju, will become the center for health, medicine and life science related government offices, industries and research institutes. CBNU will be a major element of this enterprise.

The Korea Science and Engineering Foundation (KOSEF) designated the Center for Advanced Horticultural Technology Development and Research as a Regional Research Center. KOSEF annually donate approximately $1,000,000 in grant money to the center.

The super-speed computer network (ATM) will enable all students to get personal internet IDs. Most classrooms are equipped with multimedia devices, which include PCs, LCD projectors, and data viewers.

History

Undergraduate colleges

Graduate schools

See also
Flagship Korean National Universities
List of national universities in South Korea
List of universities and colleges in South Korea
Education in Korea

References

External links
Official website, in English

Universities and colleges in North Chungcheong Province
Chungbuk National University
Cheongju
1951 establishments in South Korea
Educational institutions established in 1951
National universities and colleges in South Korea